A slit drum or slit gong is a hollow percussion instrument. In spite of the name, it is not a true drum but an idiophone, usually carved or constructed from bamboo or wood into a box with one or more slits in the top. Most slit drums have one slit, though two and three slits (cut into the shape of an "H") occur.  If the resultant tongues are different width or thicknesses, the drum will produce two different pitches. It is used throughout Africa, Southeast Asia, and Oceania. In Africa such drums, strategically situated for optimal acoustic transmission (e.g., along a river or valley), have been used for long-distance communication.

The ends of a slit drum are closed so that the shell becomes the resonating chamber for the sound vibrations created when the tongues are struck, usually with a mallet. The resonating chamber increases the volume of the sound produced by the tongue and presents the sound through an open port. If the resonating chamber is the correct size for the pitch being produced by the tongue, which means it has the correct volume of airspace to complete one full sound wave for that particular pitch, the instrument will be more efficient and louder.

The people of Vanuatu cut a large log with "totem" type carvings on the outer surface and hollow out the center leaving only a slit down the front. This hollowed out log gives the deep resonance of drums when hit on the outside with sticks.

List of slit drums

African
Alimba – Zairean (Democratic Republic of the Congo)
Ekwe – Igbo (Nigeria, Equatorial Guinea)
Ikoro – Igbo (Nigeria, Equatorial Guinea)
Krin (log drum) or Kolokolos – Guinea
Lokole – Congo Basin
Lukombé – (Democratic Republic of the Congo)
Mondo – West Africa
Mukoku – Yaka people (Congo)

Austroasiatic
Grōg (木鼓, 克罗克, 库洛, 克拉) – Wa (China and Myanmar)

Austronesian
Agung a Tamlang – Maguindanaon (Philippines)
Atingting kon - Ni-Vanuatu (Vanuatu)
Kagul – Maguindanaon (Philippines)
Kentongan – Javanese (Indonesia)
Kulkul – Balinese (Indonesia)
Lali – Fijian (Fiji)
Pahu – Māori (Aotearoa / New Zealand)  
Pate – Samoa, Cook Islands, and other parts of Polynesia
Tagutok (Philippine) – Maranao (Philippines)
To'ere – Tahitian (Tahiti)
Garamut – Papuan (Papua New Guinea)

Mesoamerican
Huiringua – Mexico
Mayohuacán – Taino people (Puerto Rico, Cuba, Dominican Republic, Caribbean)
Teponaztli – Mesoamerican

Modern
Gato – 20th-century American, originally a brand name, later generic
Tongue drum

Sinitic
The wooden fish works like a slit drum but is rarely classified there.

Gallery

See also
 Bamboo musical instruments
 Drums in communication
 Tank drum
 Wood block

Notes

References
 Hart, Mickey, and Fredric Lieberman, with D. A. Sonneborn (1991). Planet Drum: A Celebration of Percussion and Rhythm. New York: HarperCollins.

External links

 Collins Rhythmcraft page on slit drums
 Drum Museum Siebenborn, Infos about antique slit drums and hand drums from Africa and New Guinea
 Beauty of Life Blog – A few examples of wooden slit gongs from Asia, including elephant bells.

 
Melanesian musical instruments
African musical instruments
Bamboo musical instruments

pt:Tambor de troncos